Hathat Dekha is a 1967 Bengali drama film directed by Nityananda Datta. The film featured Soumitra Chatterjee, Sandhya Roy, and Jahar Roy in lead roles.

Cast
 Soumitra Chatterjee
 Sandhya Roy
 Jahar Roy
 Bhanu Bannerjee
 Anup Kumar
 Pahari Sanyal

References

External links
 

Bengali-language Indian films
1967 films
1960s Bengali-language films